Turbonilla muricatoides is a species of sea snail, a marine gastropod mollusk in the family Pyramidellidae, the pyrams and their allies.

Description
The small, slender shell is subdiaphanous to milk white. Its length measures 3 mm. The 2½ whorls of the protoconch are helicoid but slightly elevated and well rounded. Their axis is at right angles to the axis of the teleoconch. The seven whorls of the teleoconch are smooth, rather high between the sutures, and moderately rounded. They are marked by strong sublamellar axial ribs, wliich are about half as wide as the spaces that separate them, and extend strongly to the very summit of the whorl where they render the well-marked sutures crenulate. There are 14 of these ribs upon the first, 18 upon
the fifth, and 20 upon the penultimate turn. The depressed intercostal spaces terminate abruptly at the periphery. The base of the body whorl is well rounded, smooth and without sculpture. The outer lip of the type specimen is fractured, giving no indication about the aperture. The columella is slender and slightly twisted.

Distribution
The type specimen was found in the Pacific Ocean off Monterey, California.

References

External links
 To World Register of Marine Species

muricatoides
Gastropods described in 1907